HELLENiQ ENERGY Holdings Societe Anonyme is one of the largest oil companies in Southeast Europe and with its roots dating to 1958 with the establishment of the first oil refinery in Greece (Aspropyrgos).

It adopted its current name in 1998, changing from the Public Petroleum Corporation S.A., as the result of a corporate reorganization. It is a consortium of 6 subsidiaries and a number of additional companies of which it has varying degrees of management control.

Activities

Refineries and gas stations
Hellenic Petroleum operates three refineries in Greece, in Thessaloniki, Elefsina and Aspropyrgos, which account for 57% of the refining capacity of the country (the remaining 43% belongs to Motor Oil Hellas). Also owns OKTA facilities in Skopje, Republic of North Macedonia for transportation and marketing of petroleum products. Crude oil for the refineries is supplied from Saudi Arabia, Iraq, Iran, Libya and Russia. The company also operates over 1700 gas stations in Greece under the BP and EKO brands, and about 300 gas stations in Serbia, Bulgaria, Cyprus, Montenegro and the Republic of North Macedonia. It also has a network which sells LPG, jet fuel, naval fuels and lubricants.

Petrochemicals
Being the most important company that produces petrochemicals in Greece, Hellenic Petroleum has a very significant (over 50% in most cases) share of the market. Their basic products are plastics, PVC and polypropylene, aliphatic solvents and inorganic chemicals, such as chlorine and sodium hydroxide. The petrochemicals department is a part of the Thessaloniki refinery.

Electricity
Hellenic Petroleum operates a 390 MW natural gas power station in Thessaloniki. It opened in 2005 and it is operated through a subsidiary, T-Power. The fixed investment for this plant amounted to 250 million Euros.

Oil exploration
The Group has established partnerships with leading companies in the sector, been awarded exploration and production rights for hydrocarbons in a portfolio of areas in Western Greece, both offshore and onshore in various development steps.

Other
Hellenic Petroleum subsidiaries include the engineering company Asprofos and the polypropylene film production company, DIAXON, whose factory is situated in the industrial area of Komotini. The company also controls two shipping companies and has 35% shares in DEPA, the Greek natural gas company, and VPI, which produces PET resin. Since 2002 Hellenic petroleum owns 54.53% of shares in Jugopetrol AD

Ownership
The company is transitioning from a government-owned enterprise to a privately held enterprise. 21.8% of its shares are available to the public through a float on the Athens Stock Exchange, with the Greek government retaining 35.5% and Paneuropean Oil and Industrial Holdings S.A. (a Latsis family holding company) owning the remaining 45.5% of outstanding shares.

The chairman of the board of directors is Mr. Yannis Papathanasiou and the Chief Executive Officer of the company is Mr. Andreas Shiamishis.

See also

 Energy in Greece
 OKTA
 Aspropyrgos Refinery

References

External links
—

Oil and gas companies of Greece
Electric power companies of Greece
Companies listed on the Athens Exchange
Privatization in Greece
Companies based in Athens
Energy companies established in 1958
Non-renewable resource companies established in 1958
Greek brands
Greek companies established in 1958